Pteridoideae is one of the five subfamilies of the fern family Pteridaceae.  This subfamily contains about 14 genera and around 400 species.

Taxonomy

Phylogeny
The following diagram shows a likely phylogenic relationship between Pteridoideae and the other the Pteridaceae subfamilies.

The cladogram below shows one hypothesis for the evolutionary relationships among the genera of the Pteridoideae, based on a maximum likelihood analysis using six plastid markers. The authors of the study identified four major clades. The Pteris and JAPSTT clades are found worldwide; the GAPCC clade is pantropical; and the Actiniopteris+Onychium clade is restricted to the Old World.

Genera
The Pteridophyte Phylogeny Group classification of 2016 (PPG I) recognized 13 genera. Shortly afterwards, the genus Gastoniella was created for three species formerly placed in Anogramma which a molecular phylogenetic analysis had shown to be distinct.

 Actiniopteris Link
 Anogramma Link
 Austrogramme E.Fourn.
 Cerosora Domin
 Cosentinia Tod.
 Gastoniella Li Bing Zhang & Liang Zhang
 Jamesonia Hook. & Grev.
 Onychium Kaulf.
 Pityrogramma Link
 Pteris L.
 Pterozonium Fée
 Syngramma J.Sm.
 Taenitis Willd. ex Schkuhr
 Tryonia Schuettp.

References

Pteridaceae
Plant subfamilies